All the Best is a greatest hits album by English singer-songwriter Leo Sayer, released in 1993. The collection reached number 26 in the UK Albums Chart, marking Sayer's return to that chart after almost a decade's absence and becoming his twelfth UK Albums Chart entry.

According to AllMusic, All the Best "lives up to its title, offering 17 of Leo Sayer's most popular pop efforts, including each of his Top 40 singles".

As well as his fourteen UK top 40 singles, the album adds the US Billboard top 40 hit "Living in a Fantasy", and Sayer's version of the hit he wrote for Roger Daltrey, "Giving It All Away". The US version of the album also includes the US top 40 hit "Easy to Love".

Track listing
European/Australian/Japanese version

US version

Charts

References

Leo Sayer albums
1993 compilation albums
Chrysalis Records compilation albums
Albums produced by Richard Perry
Albums produced by Alan Tarney
Albums produced by Arif Mardin